Malida (Pashto 'ماليده'; alternatively spelled as Maleeda, called, Urdu: چُوری, Hindi: चूरी, or ملیدہ in Hyderabadi Urdu) is a traditional sweet dessert popular among Pashtun and Persian households in Afghanistan and Hyderabad Deccan, as well as among people in northern India and Pakistan. It is made from leftover bread (called Dudo by Pashtuns and Parathas or Rotis in desi households) that is crumbled and pounded, then stir fried with ghee, sugar, dried fruits, and nuts. Malida is often given to young children in the winter as ghee is believed to warm the body and prevent colds, and it is also a traditional dish for some Muslims on the last Wednesday of the Islamic month Safar. Malida is a common way to use up extra parathas or rotis.

Etymology 
The word 'malida' comes from Pashto word meaning 'finely crushed', equivalent of the Persian 'ميده' with the same meaning. The word Choori is derived from the word Choor (چُور) which means pieces, this implies that the Parathas or Rotis are broken down into smaller pieces and mixed with various other ingredients to make this sweet dish.

Recipe

Ingredients 
 ghee (1/3cup)
 Wheat flour (11/2 cup) or Roti/Pratha
 Sugar (1½/2 ½cup) or jaggery powder (1½/2½)
 Almonds (3 to 4 pieces)
 Cashew nuts (3 to 4 pieces)

Method 
 In a heavy-bottom pan, heat ghee.
 Add wheat flour and roast it on low heat till it turns golden-brown in color or Paratha/Roti can be used by being heated mildly.
 Turn off heat and allow the wheat flour to cool completely at room temperature. Add sugar or jaggery mix until  well blendes
 Add cashew nuts and almonds and mix in the blendes powder or blend the nuts
 You can serve churi right away or store in an airtight container for 2–3½ days.

Churi Roza 
Many Muslims in Subcontinent celebrate the last Wednesday of the Islamic month Safar by fasting, taking shower and opening the fast with sweet Choori. The method is supposedly attributed to Sunnah, but almost every Islamic Sect deems it a Bid'ah (i.e. Innovation in Religion). But still the practice is mostly carried out in villages of these countries. The married females go to the house of their parents in order to eat Choori over there and bring some for the family of their Husband.

See also
Bread pudding

References

Afghan desserts